Louise Danse (1867 – 1948) was a Belgian painter.

Life and work
She was the daughter of the painter Auguste Danse who was her first teacher. Her sister Marie Danse was also a painter. Her mother was the sister of the painter Constantin Meunier. Louise was a painter but is better known for her etchings, which were published by her husband, the publisher Robert Sand (1876-1936).

Her etching Portrait of Mlle. Dethier, was included in the 1905 book Women Painters of the World.

She became a founding member of the Brussels graphic artist collective L’Estampe in 1906, along with her sister Marie and her husband, who became the group's secretary.

Gallery

References

Bibliography
 

1867 births
1948 deaths
Artists from Brussels
Belgian women painters
19th-century Belgian painters
20th-century Belgian painters
19th-century Belgian women artists
20th-century Belgian women artists